The Jonker Walk is the Chinatown area in Malacca City in the state of Malacca, Malaysia located along Jonker Street. It starts from across Malacca River near the Stadthuys, with the street in the area filled with historical houses along its left and right sides dating back to 17th century, many of which are shops selling antiques, textiles, foods, handicrafts and souvenirs such as keychains and shirts. The area turns into a night market every Friday, Saturday and Sunday in the evening from 6 p.m. until 12 midnight, with its street blocked for traffic.

Tourist attractions
Attractions along and around the streets are:
 Baba Nyonya Heritage Museum
 Cheng Ho Cultural Museum
 Cheng Hoon Teng Temple
 Hang Jebat Mausoleum
 Hang Kasturi Mausoleum
 Kampung Hulu Mosque
 Kampung Kling Mosque
 Sri Poyatha Moorthi Temple
 Straits Chinese Jewellery Museum
 Tamil Methodist Church

Galleries

See also
 List of tourist attractions in Melaka
 Petaling Street, Kuala Lumpur

References

Chinatowns in Malaysia
Malacca City
Shopping districts and streets in Malaysia
Transport in Malacca